Seatower is a Norwegian provider of foundations for Offshore wind power.  The company, with roots from the offshore oil and gas industry back to 1994, has its headquarters in Oslo and an office in Glasgow. Seatower is considered market leader within GBS for offshore wind.

Seatower's main products are the Cranefree foundations. In February 2015 Seatower installed the first Cranefree foundation at the Fécamp offshore wind farm site in the British Channel. The customer was DONG Energy A/S and EDF EN owning the site.

References

External links
Article in Energy Engineering
Enterprise Registry Entry (Norwegian)

Engineering companies of Norway
Technology companies of Norway
Companies based in Oslo
Norwegian companies established in 1994